IPSC World Shoots can refer to several events organized by the International Practical Shooting Confederation:

 IPSC Handgun World Shoots
 IPSC Rifle World Shoots
 IPSC Shotgun World Shoots
 IPSC Action Air World Shoots

See also
 List of world sports championships